Dynamic Resolution Adaptation  (DRA) is an audio encoding specification developed by DigiRise Technology. It has been selected as the Chinese national audio coding standard  and also suitable for  China Multimedia Mobile Broadcasting and DVB-H as extensively addressed in the International Journal of Digital Multimedia Broadcasting.   

It is one of the standard formats for Blu-ray Disc audio, introduced with Blu-ray Disc 2.3. There are no discs as yet released with DRA audio, though there are expected to be such discs for the Chinese market.

References

External links 
 Yu-Li You and Wenhua Ma, "DRA Audio Coding Standard: An Overview". Fa-Long Luo (ed.), Mobile Multimedia Broadcasting Standards, Springer US, 2009.  (Print),  (Online).

Audio codecs
Blu-ray Disc